Kimble Rendall (born 1957) is an Australian director, musician and writer mostly known for his Second unit direction of The Matrix Reloaded (2003), The Matrix Revolutions (2003), I, Robot (2004), Casanova (2005) and Ghost Rider (2007). As a musician Rendall was guitarist, vocalist and co-founder of punk rockers XL Capris and of rock band the Hoodoo Gurus.

History

Early works
Rendall used an 8mm camera to write and direct short films while still at school, he completed a Bachelor of Arts in Communication and Mass Media and then trained at Australian Broadcasting Commission (ABC) as a film editor. My Survival as an Aboriginal (1978) was a documentary written and directed by Essie Coffey on her life in the township of Brewarrina produced and edited by Rendall.

XL Capris
Rendall was taking acting lessons at the Nimrod Theatre when he met Tim Gooding and Johanna Pigott, and with their mutual interest in music they formed punk rock band XL Capris in 1978 (Rendall was called 'Dag Rattler'). Rendall played lead guitar and sang vocals with Gooding (guitars, vocals) and Pigott (bass guitar, vocals, keyboards). Early practice sessions were held in the front room of a Birchgrove house where Gooding (and later Rendall) lived. They were joined by Julie Anderson (drums) and achieved minor notoriety for their first single "My City of Sydney" (1979), Rendall co-wrote (with Gooding) their second single "Skylab (Son of Telstar)" but he left XL Capris after their next single "World War Three" (October, 1980). Pigott and Gooding created Sweet and Sour (1984) for ABC-TV which followed the first year of a fictional band, The Takeaways, and was based on their experiences with XL Capris.

Hoodoo Gurus
A chance meeting on New Year's Eve with fellow guitarists Dave Faulkner and Roddy Radalj, led to the formation of the Hoodoo Gurus (with drummer James Baker) in January 1981. Rendall also managed the band whilst they developed the material for their first album Stoneage Romeos. The band supported Gary Glitter on his national tour. Rendall had a  meeting with Joe Strummer at The Sebel Townhouse when The Clash were looking for a Sydney support act. Strummer sat at the pool bar between swims, in his swimming costume and dripping wet. The band dropped the "Le" to become Hoodoo Gurus and later, after Rendall's departure, had a #3 Australian hit with "What's My Scene?" (1987). Hoodoo Gurus iconic status on the Australian rock scene was acknowledged when they were inducted into the 2007 ARIA Hall of Fame.

Music video director
Rendall returned to film as a Music video director with clips for:
XL Capris, Sardine v, Scribble, Peter Blakeley, Mental as Anything, UB40, Hoodoo Gurus, The Angels (e.g. "Between the Eyes"), Cold Chisel (e.g. "Flame Trees"), Dragon, Rockmelons, Hunters and Collectors, and Boom Crash Opera. He was voted Australia's top music video director in a poll conducted by Rolling Stone magazine.

Second unit director
In 1994, Rendall set up Flat Rock Pictures to direct TV commercials and, later, film projects. He has won all the major awards in advertising including a Cannes Lion. He directed a short film Hayride to Hell (1995) featuring Kylie Minogue and Richard Roxburgh and the teen slasher flick, Cut (2000) which starred Molly Ringwald and Minogue. Cut went to number two at the box office in France and was the second most popular Australian film there behind Strictly Ballroom. It also went to number two in Asia. Rendall became the second unit director for The Matrix Reloaded, The Matrix Revolutions and the associated video game Enter the Matrix (all in 2003). He was also second unit director for Casanova (2004) Ghost Rider (2007)., Underworld: Revenge of the Lycans (2008) and most recently Knowing (2008).

Director
Rendall is set to direct the Australian-Chinese thriller film The Nest 3D.

Personal life
Rendall married Basia Bonkowski on 17 December 1984 and they have two children.

Bonkowski was from Adelaide, born to Polish immigrants, and was a TV presenter and journalist on SBS in the 1980s (and then TEN and Seven Network). She presented Rock Around the World on SBS from 1982. Australian band Painters and Dockers released a single "Basia" (1984) in her honour. Bonkowski authored two books including Jesse's World (2005) on her adopted children. She died on 3 September 2022.

Awards and nominations

ARIA Music Awards
The ARIA Music Awards is an annual awards ceremony that recognises excellence, innovation, and achievement across all genres of Australian music. They commenced in 1987. 

! 
|-
| 1987
| Kimble Rendall for "Hands Up in the Air" (Boom Crash Opera)
| Best Video
| 
|  
|-

References

External links

Music Video Database

1950 births
Hoodoo Gurus members
Living people
Australian film directors
People from New South Wales